Happy Plugs is a Swedish company that designs smartphone accessories. The company was started by Andreas Vural in 2011, and had their first product out on the market in 2012. Currently, the mobile accessory brand is sold at over 6,000 retailers worldwide, including Colette, Le Bon Marché, Selfridges and Urban Outfitters.

History
Founder Andreas Vural created the headphones after being inspired by his girlfriend who wondered why ”most headphones only came in black and white” [sic]. When presenting the idea for friends and acquaintances, he was met with only skepticism. They questioned how he would be able to compete against established actors like Sony and Philips, leaving Vural with second thoughts. He decided to move on and commissioned a plastic manufacturer to design the packaging where the headphones are arranged in the shape of a note. Taking a pair of white iPhone headphones and spray painting them, he went on the road to sell "his product".

In August 2011, he found a distributor in Helsingborg that wished to order 25,000 of them. With no company, no actual product and no knowledge of how to produce the product, Vural was caught off guard. Despite this, he promised to deliver the headphones in time for the holiday season. Vural arranged to have them manufactured in China. On December 14, Vural delivered the first Happy Plugs to electronics retailer Siba.

In 2017 Vural stepped down as CEO and was replaced by Christina Tilman.

Collaborations
Together with MTV, Happy Plugs launched rainbow colored headphones to promote HBTQ rights.

In March 2015, Happy Plugs and the American band Thirty Seconds To Mars released a pair of headphones.

Awards
In 2013, Happy Plugs was nominated for the Swedish fashion award "Guldknappen", "the Golden Button" in the accessories category. In 2014, Happy Plugs won a Silver Pentaward for their heart shaped cable packaging.

References

Headphones manufacturers
Manufacturing companies based in Stockholm
Audio equipment manufacturers of Sweden
Companies based in Stockholm